DirectX Graphics Infrastructure (DXGI) is a user-mode component of Microsoft Windows (for Windows Vista and above) which provides a mapping between particular graphics APIs such as Direct3D 10.0 and above (known in DXGI parlance as producers) and the graphics kernel, which in turn interfaces with the user-mode Windows Display Driver Model driver. DXGI provides objects to handle tasks such as enumerating graphics adapters and monitors, enumerating display modes, choosing buffer formats, sharing resources between processes (such as between applications and the Desktop Window Manager), and presenting rendered frames to a window or monitor for display.

Both Direct3D 10 and OpenGL applications in Windows Vista work through DXGI.

DXGI 1.1 added surface sharing between the various Windows graphics API. The newest version is DXGI 1.6, introduced with Windows 10 Creators Update and updated with Windows 10 Fall Creators Update.

DXGI 2 preview has been released with the Oculus Rift SDK; it contains improvements for stereoscopic rendering.

See also 
 Quartz Compositor

References

External links
 DXGI topic on Microsoft Docs
 DXGI Overview on Microsoft Docs

DirectX